In geometry, a cross-polytope, hyperoctahedron, orthoplex, or cocube is a regular, convex polytope that exists in n-dimensional Euclidean space. A 2-dimensional cross-polytope is a square, a 3-dimensional cross-polytope is a regular octahedron, and a 4-dimensional cross-polytope is a 16-cell. Its facets are simplexes of the previous dimension, while the cross-polytope's vertex figure is another cross-polytope from the previous dimension.

The cross-polytope is the convex hull of its vertices. 
The n-dimensional cross-polytope can also be defined as the closed unit ball (or, according to some authors, its boundary) in the ℓ1-norm on Rn:

In 1 dimension the cross-polytope is simply the line segment [−1, +1], in 2 dimensions it is a square (or diamond) with vertices {(±1, 0), (0, ±1)}. In 3 dimensions it is an octahedron—one of the five convex regular polyhedra known as the Platonic solids. This can be generalised to higher dimensions with an n-orthoplex being constructed as a bipyramid with an (n−1)-orthoplex base.

The cross-polytope is the dual polytope of the hypercube. The 1-skeleton of a n-dimensional cross-polytope is a Turán graph T(2n, n).

4 dimensions 

The 4-dimensional cross-polytope also goes by the name hexadecachoron or 16-cell. It is one of the six convex regular 4-polytopes. These 4-polytopes were first described by the Swiss mathematician Ludwig Schläfli in the mid-19th century.

Higher dimensions 

The cross polytope family is one of three regular polytope families, labeled by Coxeter as βn, the other two being the hypercube family, labeled as γn, and the simplices, labeled as αn. A fourth family, the infinite tessellations of hypercubes, he labeled as δn.

The n-dimensional cross-polytope has 2n vertices, and 2n facets ((n − 1)-dimensional components) all of which are (n − 1)-simplices. The vertex figures are all (n − 1)-cross-polytopes. The Schläfli symbol of the cross-polytope is {3,3,...,3,4}. 

This gives: δ2 = arccos(0/2) = 90°, δ3 = arccos(−1/3) = 109.47°, δ4 = arccos(−2/4) = 120°, δ5 = arccos(−3/5) = 126.87°, ... δ∞ = arccos(−1) = 180°.

The hypervolume of the n-dimensional cross-polytope is 

For each pair of non-opposite vertices, there is an edge joining them. More generally, each set of k + 1 orthogonal vertices corresponds to a distinct k-dimensional component which contains them. The number of k-dimensional components (vertices, edges, faces, ..., facets) in an n-dimensional cross-polytope is thus given by (see binomial coefficient):

There are many possible orthographic projections that can show the cross-polytopes as 2-dimensional graphs. Petrie polygon projections map the points into a regular 2n-gon or lower order regular polygons. A second projection takes the 2(n−1)-gon petrie polygon of the lower dimension, seen as a bipyramid, projected down the axis, with 2 vertices mapped into the center.

The vertices of an axis-aligned cross polytope are all at equal distance from each other in the Manhattan distance (L1 norm). Kusner's conjecture states that this set of 2d points is the largest possible equidistant set for this distance.

Generalized orthoplex 
Regular complex polytopes can be defined in complex Hilbert space called generalized orthoplexes (or cross polytopes), β = 2{3}2{3}...2{4}p, or ... Real solutions exist with p = 2, i.e. β = βn = 2{3}2{3}...2{4}2 = {3,3,..,4}. A p-generalized n-orthoplex has pn vertices. Generalized orthoplexes have regular simplexes (real) as facets. Generalized orthoplexes make complete multipartite graphs, β make Kp,p for complete bipartite graph, β make Kp,p,p for complete tripartite graphs. β creates Kpn. An orthogonal projection can be defined that maps all the vertices equally-spaced on a circle, with all pairs of vertices connected, except multiples of n. The regular polygon perimeter in these orthogonal projections is called a petrie polygon.

Related polytope families 

Cross-polytopes can be combined with their dual cubes to form compound polytopes:

In two dimensions, we obtain the octagrammic star figure ,
In three dimensions we obtain the compound of cube and octahedron,
In four dimensions we obtain the compound of tesseract and 16-cell.

See also 

 List of regular polytopes
 Hyperoctahedral group, the symmetry group of the cross-polytope

Citations

References
 
 pp. 121-122, §7.21. see illustration Fig 7.2B
 p. 296, Table I (iii): Regular Polytopes, three regular polytopes in n-dimensions (n≥5)

External links 

 

Polytopes
Multi-dimensional geometry